Glaucina escaria is a species of geometrid moth in the family Geometridae. It is found in North America.

The MONA or Hodges number for Glaucina escaria is 6495.

References

Further reading

 
 
 

Boarmiini